Azerbaijani Management Union of Medical Territorial Units – TABIB (azərb. Tibbi Ərazi Bölmələrini İdarəetmə Birliyi (TƏBİB)) – is a public legal entity under the State Agency for Compulsory Health Insurance. The Chairman of the Azerbaijani Management Union of Medical Territorial Units is Ramin Bayramli.

History 
On December 20, 2018, President of Azerbaijan Ilham Aliyev signed a decree on the establishment of Azerbaijani Management Union of Medical Territorial Units (TƏBIB) under The State Agency for compulsory health insurance to ensure the implementation of mandatory medical insurance in the country.

On April 18, 2019, the list of medical institutions subordinate to the Azerbaijani Management Union of Medical Territorial Units" was approved.

Since 2020, many state institutions subordinate to the Ministry of Healthcare of Azerbaijan have been transferred to the Azerbaijani Management Union of Medical Territorial Units.

Chairman 
The Chairman of the organization Ramin Bayramli has graduated from the faculty of medical prevention of the Azerbaijan Medical University. In 2011–2016, he was the head of the Central laboratory of the educational and therapeutic clinic of AMU, in 2013–2016 he worked as a chief doctor of the same clinic. Since 2013, he has been an associate Professor of the Department of Microbiology and immunology at AMU. On December 2, 2019, he was appointed as a Chairman of Azerbaijani Management Union of Medical Territorial Units.

See also 
 Azerbaijan
 Medicine in Azerbaijan
 Ministry of Healthcare (Azerbaijan)
 State Agency for Compulsory Health Insurance (Azerbaijan)

References 

Health in Azerbaijan
Government agencies of Azerbaijan